Vice Admiral Sir Timothy Pentreath McClement,  (born 16 May 1951) is a former Royal Navy officer who served as Deputy Commander-in-Chief Fleet from 2004 to 2006.

Naval career
Educated at Douai School and the Royal Naval College, Dartmouth, McClement joined the Royal Navy in 1971. He served as a submariner in the Falklands War and was second-in-command of the nuclear-powered hunter killer submarine  and oversaw the attack on the Belgrano on 2 May 1982.

McClement became Commanding Officer of the submarine  in 1983, Staff Captain Submarine Sea Training in 1985 and Commanding Officer of the Submarine Commander's Qualifying Course in 1987. He was appointed Commanding Officer of the submarine  in 1989, Commanding Officer of the frigate  in 1992, a staff officer on the Directorate of Naval Staff Duties at the Ministry of Defence in 1994 and officer responsible for setting up the Plans Division at Permanent Joint Headquarters in 1996. He went on to be Deputy Flag Officer Submarines in 1997, Commanding Officer of the frigate  as well as Captain of the 2nd Frigate Squadron in 1999 and Assistant Chief of the Naval Staff in 2001. His last appointments were as Chief of Staff (Warfare) to the Commander-in-Chief Fleet in 2003 and Deputy Commander-in-Chief Fleet in 2004 before retiring in 2006.

In retirement McClement became Chairman of the Royal Navy Submarine Museum at Gosport.

References

|-

1951 births
Living people
Graduates of Britannia Royal Naval College
Royal Navy vice admirals
Knights Commander of the Order of the Bath
Officers of the Order of the British Empire
People educated at Douai School